Roberto "Rober" Ibáñez Castro (born 22 March 1993) is a Spanish professional footballer who plays as a right winger for Levante UD.

Club career
Born in Valencia, Valencian Community, Rober joined Valencia CF's youth setup in 2000, aged seven. He made his senior debuts for the reserves in the 2010–11 season in Tercera División, and subsequently appeared regularly with the side in Segunda División B.

In the 2014 summer, Rober was called up to the main squad by new manager Nuno Espírito Santo, also taking part of the club's Emirates Cup winning campaign. He made his first-team – and La Liga – debut on 29 August 2014, coming on as a late substitute in a 3–0 home win against Málaga CF.

On 16 January 2015, Rober was loaned to fellow league team Granada CF, until June. On 25 January 2015, he scored his first professional goal, netting the last in a 2–2 home draw against Deportivo de La Coruña.

On 13 July 2015, Rober returned to the Andalusians, in a season-long loan deal. He would only appear in 18 matches during the campaign (seven starts), as his side avoided relegation. On 31 August of the following year, he moved to fellow top tier CD Leganés, after agreeing to a one-year loan deal.

On 21 November 2016, Rober scored a double in a 2–0 home win against CA Osasuna, but suffered a serious knee injury which sidelined him for the remainder of the season. On 3 January 2018, he signed a three-and-a-half-year contract with Getafe CF still in the top tier, but was immediately loaned to Osasuna in Segunda División until June.

On 29 January 2019, after being sparingly used by Geta in the 2018–19 campaign, Rober returned to Osasuna on loan until June. On 12 August, after achieving promotion to the top tier, he signed a permanent four-year deal with the club, for a fee of € 2 million; his release clause was set at €10 million.

On 24 August 2020, Rober returned to Lega on loan for the 2020–21 season, with an obligatory buyout clause in case of promotion. He rejoined the club for a third spell on 11 January 2022, also on loan.

On 10 August 2022, Rober signed a two-year contract with Levante UD in the second level.

Club statistics

References

External links
Valencia official profile 

1993 births
Living people
Footballers from Valencia (city)
Spanish footballers
Association football wingers
La Liga players
Segunda División players
Segunda División B players
Valencia CF Mestalla footballers
Valencia CF players
Granada CF footballers
CD Leganés players
Getafe CF footballers
CA Osasuna players
Levante UD footballers